The Congress of Black Writers and Artists (French: Congrès des écrivains et artistes noirs; originally called the Congress of Negro Writers and Artists) was a meeting of leading black intellectuals for the purpose of addressing the issues of colonialism, slavery, and Négritude. The First Congress of Black Writers and Artists was organized by the Pan-African quarterly cultural, political, and literary review Présence Africaine. It was held in Paris in September 1956. Ahmed Sékou Touré spoke at the Second Congress of Black Writers and Artists, which was held in Rome in 1959. One of the most influential Congress was held in Montreal at the University of McGill October 11–14, 1968, it was organized primarily by the Caribbean Conference Committee and was described as the "largest Black Power conference ever held outside the United States"

Princes and Powers by James Baldwin
The account of the congress in the essay Princes and Powers, by African-American writer James Baldwin, has been credited with bringing the congress to the attention of the English-speaking world. Reports of the congress were published in many newspapers around Paris giving the wider French audience an idea of the issues being discussed. The essay was published in the literary journal Preuves, which unknown to Baldwin, was a front for the CIA. Regardless of the political ties, this essay spread the news of the Black Congress to English speakers around the world.

In Princes and Powers, Baldwin recaps the philosophical discussions around African statehood but also conflicts surrounding Négritude. Baldwin and other American delegates found themselves isolated from the ideas spouted by French-speaking delegates such as  Alioune Diop and Léopold Sédar Senghor. As proponents of Négritude, Diop and Senghor supported the creation of an international black identity that was separated from imperialism and colonialism. As a Black American, Baldwin noted that the constant references to one black identity only highlighted the significant differences in the black experience. For example, Baldwin mentioned the discussion around what constitutes culture. He questioned if there can be a singular black culture when black people have been dispersed throughout the globe living under different conditions and history. The only thing that seemed to connect the black delegates was their relation to the white world. However, négritude advocated for a black identity outside of whiteness. How can an international black identity be created outside of white when it is white oppression that connects black peoples together?

References

Academic conferences
Visual arts conferences
International conferences
Pan-Africanist organizations
Postcolonialism
Writers' conferences
Recurring events established in 1956
1956 conferences
1959 conferences